Notable people named Nikko include:

Given name
 Nikko Boxall (born 1992), New Zealand-Samoan footballer for Viborg FF
 Nikko Briteramos (born 1983), American basketball player, convicted of intentional exposure to HIV
 Nikko Hurtado (born 1981), American tattoo artist
 Nikko Jenkins (born 1986), American spree killer
 Nikko Landeros (born 1989), American ice sledge hockey player
 Nikko Locastro (born 1988), American disc golf player
 Nikko London (born 1975), American television personality, singer and record producer
 Nikko Natividad (born 1993), Filipino model and dancer
 Nikko Patrelakis, Greek musician
 Nikko Shonin (1246–1333), founder of Nichiren Shoshu Buddhism
 Nikko Smith (born 1982), American singer-songwriter

Surname
 Joni Nikko (born 1994), Finnish ice hockey player for KalPa

Fictional characters 

 Nikko Halloran, a character in RoboCop 3, played by actress Remy Ryan

See also

Nikki (given name)
Nikky
Niko (disambiguation)

Unisex given names